Vera Reitzer (born Schon; 1921–2006) was a Jewish holocaust survivor, who later moved to South Africa and supported the apartheid regime. She joined Malan's Nationalist Party in 1950.

Reitzer was born in Hungary and was sent to Auschwitz in 1944, with her mother (age 44 and a niece of Sigmund FREUD) and sister. After eight months they were sent to a factory in Germany (between Leipzig and Dresden), where they had to fill shells with gunpowder.

On 26 April 1945, they were rescued by US soldiers. Vera, fluent in five languages, acted as a translator between the Germans and Americans. In 1948 she moved to Israel, where she married Mirko Reitzer. They moved to South Africa in 1952. Her mother lived with her in Johannesburg until she died in 1995. Her sister Rosi died in Brazil in 2003. She was survived by two sons and six grandchildren.

References

Auschwitz concentration camp survivors
National Party (South Africa) politicians
1921 births
2006 deaths
Hungarian expatriates in Israel
Hungarian emigrants to South Africa